Nuclear factor 1 B-type is a protein that in humans is encoded by the NFIB gene.

NFIB haploinsufficiency is also associated with intellectual disability and macrocephaly, as are NFIA and NFIX.

Embryonic Development 
The NFIB gene is a part of the NFI gene complex that includes three other genes (NFIA, NFIC and NFIX). The NFIB gene is a protein coding gene that also serves as a transcription factor. This gene is essential in embryonic development and it works together with its gene complex to initiate tissue differentiation in the fetus. NFIB has the highest concentrations in the lung, skeletal muscle and heart but is also found in the areas of the developing liver, kidneys and brain. 

Through knockout experiments, researchers found that mice without the NFIB gene have severely underdeveloped lungs. This mutation does not seem to cause spontaneous abortions because in utero the fetus does not use its lungs for respiration. However, this becomes lethal once the fetus is born and has to take its first breath. It is thought that NFIB plays a role in down regulating the transcription factors TGF-β1 and Shh in normal gestation because they remained high in knockout experiments. The absence of NFIB also leads to insufficient amounts of surfactant being produced which is one reason why the mice cannot breathe once it is born. The knockout experiments demonstrated that NFIB has a significant role in fore-brain development. NFIB is typically found in pontine nuclei of the CNS, the cerebral cortex and the white matter of the brain and without NFIB these areas are dramatically affected.

Absence of one copy is associated with macrocephaly and intellectual disability. This associated was confirmed in mouse modelswhere deletion of one copy resulted in enlargement of the brain while preserving its overall organisation.

References

Further reading

External links 
 

Transcription factors